is a 1996 Japanese video game for the Sega Saturn. Developed by Victor Entertainment, it is a direct sequel to Keio Flying Squadron. While the first game is a side-scrolling shoot 'em up, the second game is a platformer with shooter sections.

Like the first game, the second game refers to Japanese culture, both ancient and modern simultaneously.

Plot
The second installment of the series continues the story of Rami Nana-Hikari's adventures as the keeper of the Secret Treasure. A year has passed since the apocalyptic disaster which left a great crater in the center of Edo City. The destruction wrought major economic consequences and while much investment was poured into the public works for the new Edo Castle, the citizens were all feeling the pinch of the recession.

Dr. Pon Eho was no exception. Although a freak of nature with an astronomical IQ of 1400, hard reality forced the genius raccoon to become a laborer in the construction of the New Castle. One day, while he was shoveling away some gravel near the center of the crater, he unearthed the Secret Treasure Scroll and one of the Six Magical Orbs! With the knowledge that the six Orbs together would bring him enormous wealth, he quickly left his job in search of the remaining five Orbs listed on the Scroll's map.

Meanwhile, Himiko Yamatai, "the Pompous Queen of the Ancients", makes a dramatic appearance at the Nana-Hikari family's dinner table and grabs the family's Magical Orb. But before she can get away, Dr. Pon ambushes her and steals it. Of course, Rami makes chase and joins the race for the great treasure, starting her on her new adventure. 

This game features animated cutscenes provided by Studio Pierrot, who also provided the animation for the cutscenes in the first game.

Gameplay 
The game mainly consists of sidescrolling platformer stages. Two of the stages retain the shoot-'em-up style of the first game, but the lesser dragons can be obtained as bonuses only. Besides the platformer and shoot-'em-up stages, there are vertically scrolling special stages, an underwater stage and a rollercoaster stage, classifying the game as a multi-genre platformer.

Several bonuses can be collected including three weapons:
Atami - The Hammer of Dreams - A large mallet, used only for hitting enemies.
Kinugawa - The Umbrella of Love - An umbrella, used to hit enemies, float and deflect overhead obstacles.
Kusatsu - The Arrow of Hope - A bow, used to shoot arrows at enemies.

Rami can also bounce on the heads of enemies to defeat them. Being damaged without holding an item results in the loss of a life. Background objects can be pick up and thrown at enemies to defeat them. Some background objects can also have a utility use. There are three difficulty levels which alter how many enemies there are to defeat and how quickly weapons disappear after being damaged.

Points Orbs can be collected throughout the game. Defeating some enemies also rewards points but there are enemies such as miners that are considered passive and will instead deduct points when defeated. A reward system accessed from the main menu unlocks helpful hints and behind-the-scenes extras depending on the highest and lowest scores achieved through playing.

Characters 
Japanese names are given in the western order, given name first.

Rami Nana-Hikari - Grandchild of an ancient family with the mission of guarding the Key that opens the Ark, Rami wears a traditional kimono at the beginning of the game, and changes into the "Super Ultra Cute Battle Suit", which is nothing more than a bunny girl costume, complete with bunny ears and tail. Voiced by Miho Kanno (Japanese); Samantha Paris (English).
Spot Nana-Hikari - Rami's pet dragon, always loyal but as lazy as his owner. Because he worked so hard in the first game, he became soporose and now sleeps and nods out whenever he can. In this game, he has a supporting role assisting Rami. Spot is called Pochi in the Japanese release of the game. Voiced by Mika Kanai (Japanese); Roger L. Jackson (English).
"Grandma" and "Grandpa" Nana-Hikari - Rami's natural grandparents who have brought her up and belong to the clan of the keeper who have been guarding the Key of the Secret Treasure and Magical Orb for generations. Two years ago, when they came to the realization that they no longer look very good in the bunny suits, they decided to resign their posts to Rami and enjoy their retirement. Voiced by Keiko Yamamoto (Japanese; Grandma), Jōji Yanami (Japanese; Grandpa); Roger L. Jackson (English; both).
Himiko Yamatai - Rami's rival, a princess who claims the Orbs rightfully belong to her royal family. She controls the mysterious psi-powered vehicle Psy-Vee 1 and 2. Himiko is a year younger than Rami, according to the game's English manual, which would make her 13. Voiced by Mika Kanai (Japanese); Elaine A. Clarke (English).
Dr. Pon Eho - A super intelligent raccoon who stole the Nana-Hikari family's Magical Orb. His IQ is 1400. He is a member of Greenpeace. Voiced by Jōji Yanami (Japanese); Roger L. Jackson (English).

Voice cast

Japanese 
Miho Kanno as Rami Nana-Hikari
Mika Kanai as Spot Nana-Hikari and Himiko Yamatai
Jōji Yanami as Dr. Pon Eho and Grandpa
Keiko Yamamoto as Grandma and Funny Face #2
Kae Araki as Yōshiko Oroshiya
Keiji Fujiwara as Fire Raccoons, Fishing Raccoons, Sumo Wrestler #1, Sumo Wrestler #2, Kurobei, Funny Face #3, Castle Promenade Raccoon, Ninjas, 3-Meter Alien, Benkei Musashibō and Cardinal Xavier
Nobuo Tobita as Umbrella Raccoon and Mech-Shogun
Wataru Takagi as Toxic Waste Disposer
Dai Sasahara as Yobidashi, Musashi the Sumo Champion, Funny Face #1 and Apocalypse's Heart
Hikiko Takemasa as Hamster and Cat
Recording Studio: Avaco Creative Studios

English 
Samantha Paris as Rami Nana-Hikari and Hamster
Roger L. Jackson as Spot Nana-Hikari, Dr. Pon Eho, Grandma, Grandpa, Umbrella Raccoon, Fire Raccoons, Fishing Raccoons, Sumo Wrestler #1, Sumo Wrestler #2, Musashi the Sumo Champion, Funny Face #3, Castle Promenade Raccoon and Ninjas
Elaine A. Clark as Himiko Yamatai, Funny Face #1, Funny Face #2, 3-Meter Alien and Yōshiko Oroshiya
Toby Gleason as Toxic Waste Disposer, Benkei Musashibō and Cat
Don Robins as Kurobei, Mech-Shogun and Cardinal Xavier
Recording Studio: Music Annex, San Francisco, CA
Translation & Recording: Watanabe-Robins and Associates

Release 
 was released in May 1996 for the Sega Saturn in Japan, in August 1996 in Europe, and Australia. 
 was a "not for resale" Sega Saturn disc only available in Japan in 1996. The disc contains higher quality versions of both the opening and ending FMV sequences of the first game, demo levels from the second game, and an art gallery available both in-game and separately, being accessible on the CD via a personal computer.

 is a party game released only in Japan on the PlayStation on September 17, 1998. The title roughly translates to "Rami-chan's Big Edo Sugoroku - a Keiō Yūgekitai Sidestory." Edo is the old name of Tokyo.

Reception 

Sam Hickman wrote in Sega Saturn Magazine that the game has very generic and overly easy gameplay, but is still somewhat fun to play, largely due to the intriguingly strange graphics. However, she concluded that most people would not find it worth the retail price, and scored it a 78%.

References

External links
Keio Flying Squadron 2 at MobyGames

1996 video games
Video games about dragons
Horizontally scrolling shooters
Platform games
Science fantasy video games
Sega Saturn games
Sega Saturn-only games
Video game sequels
Video games developed in Japan
Video games featuring female protagonists
Video games scored by Tsukasa Tawada
Video games set in Japan
Video games set in the 19th century
Single-player video games